I Am a Scientist is a 1994 EP released by Guided by Voices.  The title track originally appeared in a stripped down, four track version on the band's celebrated 1994 LP Bee Thousand; a music video was also made.  The song appears here in a live-in-studio full-band arrangement recorded by Andy Shernoff, along with three other songs.

Track listing
All songs written by Robert Pollard.
 "I Am a Scientist" [7" Version] – 2:31
 "Curse of the Black Ass Buffalo" – 1:20
 "Do the Earth" – 2:42
 "Planet's Own Brand" – 1:15

References 

1994 EPs
Guided by Voices EPs